The Cuban Popular Party was a political party in Cuba which participated between 1920 and 1938 in political elections. In the 1932 Cuban parliamentary election they won 6 of 69 seats up for election in the House of Representatives.

References

Defunct political parties in Cuba